The 2014 Rally America Championship was the tenth season of the Rally America Championship, the premier rally championship in the United States. The season began 24 January in Michigan, and returned to Michigan for the Lake Superior Performance Rally, the final round of the season, on 18 October after eight events.

The championship was won by defending champion David Higgins. Higgins won the season opening Sno*Drift Rally and while he retired from Rally in the 100 Acre Wood he then went on to win four events in a row, wrapping up the championship early at the New England Forest Rally with two rallies still to be held. Higgins finished 57 points clear of Adam Yeoman, and 59 points ahead of Dillon van Way. Yeoman took four podium finishes with a best of second at the Ojibwe Forests Rally, while van Way achieved his position through consistent top six finishes in all eight rallies held, peaking with a third place at the Mt. Washington Hillclimb. The championship victory meant Higgins joined Travis Pastrana as a four-time Rally America champion. Both drivers achieved their four titles consecutively, dominating their periods of competition.

Race calendar and results

The 2014 Rally America Championship was as follows:

Championship standings
Drivers scoring at least ten points are shown. The 2014 Rally America Championship points are as follows:

References

External links

Rally America seasons
America
Rally America